Fried Green Tomatoes: Original Motion Picture Score is the film score to the 1991 Academy Award-nominated film Fried Green Tomatoes.

Track listing 
"Ghost Train", performed by Marion Williams (3:12)
"Whistle Stop, Ala." (1:16)
"A Charge To Keep I Have", performed by Marion Williams (2:34)
"Xmas in Hooverville" (1:51)
"The Tree House" (1:08)
"Night Baseball", performed by Marion Williams (0:57)
"Whither Thou Goest I Will Go" (1:51)
"Buddy Threadgoode" (1:18)
"Didn't It Rain", performed by Marion Williams (2:51)
"The Bee Charmer" (1:59)
"Wallpaper" (1:31)
"The Smell of Coffee" (1:10)
"Visiting Ruth" (1:43)
"Miss Otis Died" (1:27)
"The Town Follies", performed by Ralph Grierson (0:44)
"Klansmen" (2:04)
"Smokey Lonesome" (1:23)
"Big George", performed by Marion Williams
"Night Baseball" [Mandolin Reprise] (1:02)
"The Whistle Stop Cafe" (2:25)

1992 soundtrack albums
MCA Records soundtracks
Comedy film soundtracks
Drama film soundtracks